Dzhalindite is a rare indium hydroxide mineral discovered in Siberia. Its chemical formula is In(OH)3. 

It was first described in 1963 for an occurrence in the Dzhalinda tin deposit, Malyi Khingan Range, Khabarovskiy Kray, Far-Eastern Region, Russia.

It has also been reported from Mount Pleasant, New Brunswick, Canada; the Flambeau mine, Ladysmith, Rusk County, Wisconsin, US; in the Mangabeira tin deposit, Goiás, Brazil; Attica, mines of the Lavrion District, Greece; Erzgebirge, Saxony, Germany; the Krušné Hory Mountains of Bohemia, Czech Republic; the Chubu Region, Honshu Island, Japan; and the Arashan Massif of Tashkent, Uzbekistan.

References

Hydroxide minerals
Indium minerals
Cubic minerals
Minerals in space group 204
Minerals described in 1963